Mazraa or Mazra'a may refer to:

Places

Syria
Al-Mazraa, a town in southern Syria in the Al-Suwayda Governorate

Lebanon
Corniche el Mazraa,  Street in Beirut 
Mazraa, a town in Lebanon
Mazraat El Chouf, a town and area in Chouf District, Lebanon
Mazraa, a commercial district in Beirut, Lebanon
Mazraat Al Toufah, a village in Zgharta District, Lebanon
Mazraat En Nahr, a village in Zgharta District, Lebanon

Israel
Mazra'a, a local council in the western Galilee 
el-Mazra'a, or Mizra, ancient site in the Jezreel Valley also called Hirbat el Mizra 
Khirbet el Mazra'a, locality in the Upper Galilee now Zar'it

Palestine
Al-Mazra'a ash-Sharqiya, a Palestinian town near Ramallah 
Al-Mazra'a al-Qibliya, a Palestinian village, now part of Al-Zaitounah town in the Ramallah and al-Bireh Governorate
Al-Muzayri'a, a Palestinian village in the Ramle Subdistrict

Other
 Battle of al-Mazraa